Chișinău railway station is the main railway station serving Chișinău, Moldova. It is located on 1 Aleea Garii, not far from the centre of the city.

International services
In addition to local trains, international services operate from Chișinău to Bucharest, Kyiv, Moscow (all daily), Minsk (Tuesday, Friday, and Sunday), and Warsaw (Monday, Wednesday, and Friday). Daily trains also run to Saint Petersburg and Odessa. There are several trains each week to Iași in Romania, and daily services to Tiraspol.

The station is equipped as an international port of entry/exit, with a customs hall, and border control. International services arrive at and depart from platform 1, whose concourse can be closed off with barriers to create a contained customs zone.

References

railway station
Railway stations in Moldova
Railway stations opened in 1871